Cynthia Senek (born 27 November 1991) is a Brazilian actress.

Filmography

References

External links 
 

1991 births
Living people
Actresses from Curitiba
Brazilian television actresses
21st-century Brazilian actresses